Split screen is a display technique in computer graphics that consists of dividing graphics and/or text into adjacent (and possibly overlapping) parts, typically as two or four rectangular areas. This is done to allow the simultaneous presentation of (usually) related graphical and textual information on a computer display. TV sports used this presentation methodology in the 1960s for instant replay.

The original non-dynamic split screens differed from windowing systems in that the latter always allowed overlapping and freely movable parts of the screen (the "windows") to present related as well as unrelated application data to the user, while the former were strictly limited to fixed non-overlapping positions.

The split screen technique can also be used to run two instances of an application, possibly with another user interacting with the other instance.

In video games
The split screen feature is commonly used in non-networked, also known as couch co-op, video games with multiplayer options.

In its most easily understood form, a split screen for a two-player video game is an audiovisual output device (usually a standard television for video game consoles) where the display has been divided into two equally sized areas so that the players can explore different areas simultaneously without being close to each other. This has historically been remarkably popular on consoles, which until the 2000s did not have access to the Internet or any other network and is less common today with modern support for online console-to-console multiplayer support.

History 
Split screen gaming dates back to at least the 1970s, with games such Drag Race (1977) from Kee Games in the arcades being presented in this format. It has always been a common feature of two or more player home console and computer games too, with notable titles being Kikstart II for 8-bit systems, a number of driving and racing games (such as Lotus Esprit Turbo Challenge and Road Rash II on 16-bit systems), and Lemmings on 16-bit systems all employing a vertical or horizontal screen split for two player games.

Xenophobe is notable as a three-way split screen arcade title, although on home platforms it was reduced to one or two screens. The addition of four controller ports on home consoles also ushered in more four-way split screen games, with Mario Kart 64 and Goldeneye 007 on the Nintendo 64 being two well known examples. In arcades, machines tended to move towards having a whole screen for each player, or multiple connected machines, for multiplayer. On home machines, especially in the first and third person shooter genres, multiplayer is now more common over a network or the internet rather than locally with split screen.

See also
 Multiplayer video game
 Screen tearing
 Split screen (video production)

References

Computer graphics
User interface techniques
Video game terminology